John Christopher Anictomatis AO (born 28 December 1945) is a Greek Australian who served as the Administrator of the Northern Territory from 28 November 2000 to 30 October 2003. Anictomatis was sworn in by Sir William Deane, the Governor-General of Australia. The ceremony was held in Darwin.

He was a businessman and active in community service. His wife Jeanette is British Honorary Consul in Darwin.

References

External links
 NT Government Biography

1945 births
Living people
Administrators of the Northern Territory
Australian Army soldiers
Australian military personnel of the Vietnam War
Greek emigrants to Australia
Officers of the Order of Australia
People from the Northern Territory
Recipients of the Centenary Medal